Rainer-Malkowski-Preis is a literary prize of Germany. The prize is awarded every two years by the Bavarian Academy of Fine Arts in cooperation with the Rainer Malkowski Foundation. The Rainer Malkowski Prize, with prize money of 30,000 euros, is one of the most highly endowed German literary prizes.

Recipients
 2006: Manfred Peter Hein
 2008: Adolf Endler und Kurt Drawert (equal parts)
 2010: Angela Krauß
 2012: Christoph Meckel und Lutz Seiler (equal parts)
 2014: Daniela Danz und Mirko Bonné (equal parts)
 2016: Klaus Merz (main prize); Efrat Gal-Ed (scholarship)
 2018: Ror Wolf (main prize); Sylvia Geist (scholarship)
 2020: Anja Kampmann und Norbert Hummelt (equal parts)

References

External links
 

German literary awards